BBC Science Focus (previously BBC Focus) is a British monthly magazine about science and technology published in Bristol, UK by Immediate Media Company. Edited by Daniel Bennett, it covers all aspects of science and technology and is written for general readers as well as people with a knowledge of science. Formerly known as Focus and published by Gruner + Jahr and Nat Mags, the magazine was taken over by BBC Magazines in mid-2005 and renamed BBC Focus. There are also regular science celebrity features and interviews. Their official website is known as Science Focus.

Regular features
 Intro-a few paragraphs from the editor
 Eye Opener – interesting or amazing photography
 Letters to the editor
 Discoveries- news articles about the world of science
 Features (main topics)
 Q&A – a section welcoming science queries from readers and answers from an expert panel
 Out There –  a round up of the latest factual books, films, television and radio, exhibitions and events
 Innovations - news and reviews from the world of technology

References

External links
Official home page
Immediate Media

1992 establishments in the United Kingdom
BBC publications
Monthly magazines published in the United Kingdom
Science and technology magazines published in the United Kingdom
Magazines established in 1992
Mass media in Bristol